Striatoandricus is a genus of Neotropical gall wasps (Cynipidae). There are six described species, four of which were formerly included in Andricus. All species induce galls on oaks in which their larvae live and feed.

References 

Cynipidae
Hymenoptera genera
Taxa named by Juli Pujade-Villar